Frank Crowther (July 10, 1870 – July 20, 1955) was a United States Representative from New York. Born in Liverpool, England, he emigrated to the United States in 1872 with his parents, who settled in Canton, Massachusetts. He attended the public schools, graduated from the Lowell School of Design (a branch of the Massachusetts Institute of Technology) in 1888 and was a designer of fabrics, carpets, and rugs for seven years. He graduated from the Harvard Dental School in 1898 and commenced practice in Boston; in 1901 he moved to Perth Amboy, New Jersey and continued the practice of dentistry. He was a member of the New Jersey General Assembly in 1904 and 1905 and a member of the Middlesex County Board of Taxation from 1906 to 1909.

In 1912, Crowther moved to Schenectady, New York and continued the practice of his profession until elected to Congress; he was president of the common council of Schenectady in 1917 and 1918, and elected as a Republican to the Sixty-sixth and to the eleven succeeding Congresses, holding office from March 4, 1919 to January 3, 1943. During the Seventy-first Congress he was chairman of the Committee on Memorials. He was not a candidate for renomination in 1942 and in 1943 moved to Pueblo, Colorado and engaged in violin study, landscape painting, and public speaking. He died in Pueblo in 1955; interment was in Roselawn Cemetery.

References

1870 births
1955 deaths
Harvard School of Dental Medicine alumni
Massachusetts Institute of Technology alumni
American dentists
People from Perth Amboy, New Jersey
Politicians from Middlesex County, New Jersey
Republican Party members of the New Jersey General Assembly
English emigrants to the United States
Politicians from Liverpool
Republican Party members of the United States House of Representatives from New York (state)